Flávio Rodrigues da Costa (14 September 1906 – 22 November 1999) was a Brazilian football player and manager. He managed the Rio de Janeiro clubs Vasco da Gama and Flamengo, as well as Colo Colo of Chile, and FC Porto of Portugal.

Costa coached the Brazilian squad at the 1950 FIFA World Cup; the loss against Uruguay has been described as Brazil's greatest humiliation of the 20th century. As a consequence of his World Cup failure, he lost his prestige among the Brazilian press and supporters of the national team. However, he was again manager of the Brazilian team in 1955 and in 1956.

He died in Rio de Janeiro in November 1999.

Playing career
From 1926 until 1936, Costa played 145 matches, mostly as a midfielder, in the black and red jerseys of Flamengo and scored 15 goals in the process. From September 1934 forward he was player-manager.

The climax of his playing career was the winning of the state championship of Rio de Janeiro in 1927.

Statistical overview

References

External links
  
  
 

1906 births
1999 deaths
Brazilian footballers
Brazilian expatriate football managers
Brazilian football managers
Expatriate football managers in Portugal
Brazilian expatriate sportspeople in Portugal
Expatriate football managers in Chile
Brazilian expatriate sportspeople in Chile
1950 FIFA World Cup managers
Campeonato Brasileiro Série A managers
CR Flamengo footballers
CR Flamengo managers
Associação Atlética Portuguesa (RJ) managers
Santos FC managers
Brazil national football team managers
CR Vasco da Gama managers
FC Porto managers
Associação Portuguesa de Desportos managers
Colo-Colo managers
São Paulo FC managers
Bangu Atlético Clube managers
Association football midfielders
Player-coaches